The Beneš-Mráz Be-56 Beta-Major was a single-seat aerobatic advanced trainer manufactured in Czechoslovakia shortly before World War II.

Design and development
First flown in 1936, the Be-56 was a low-wing cantilever monoplane of wooden construction, with a single open cockpit and fixed tailwheel undercarriage. A two-seat version was produced as the Beneš-Mráz Be-52 Beta-Major, with tandem open cockpits

Variants
Be-52 Beta-Major Two-seat aerobatic trainer derived from the Be-51, but powered by a Walter Major engine; one built.
Be-56 Beta-Major Single-seat version of the Be-52; one built (OK-BEG).

Operational history
The sole Be-56, registered OK-BEG, was used by the Slovak Air Force after the German takeover of Czechoslovakia in 1939.

Operators

Slovak Air Force (1939–45)

Specifications (Be-56)

References

Further reading

 
 
 
 

1930s Czechoslovakian sport aircraft
Beneš-Mráz aircraft
Single-engined tractor aircraft
Low-wing aircraft
Aircraft first flown in 1936
Aerobatic aircraft